Salisbury Football Club is an English football club based in Salisbury, Wiltshire.

Ground

The club play their home games at The Raymond McEnhill Stadium. The stadium's capacity officially stands at 4,000 (although it is technically able to hold 5,000), with covered accommodation for 2,247 fans.

Players

Non-playing staff
 Manager: Brian Dutton
 Assistant Manager: Callum Hart
 Chairman: Ian Hammond
 Vice Chairman: Jeremy Harwood
 Coach: Chris Keane
 Sport Therapist: Mark Povey
 Kit Man: Michael Western

Honours
Wessex League Premier Division
 Winners (1): 2015–16
 Southern League South & West
 Runners-up (1): 2017–18
 Salisbury Hospital Cup
 Winners (1): 2016–17
 Wiltshire County Cup
 Runners-up (1): 2018–19

References

External links
Official website

Association football clubs established in 2015
Football clubs in Wiltshire
Wessex Football League
2015 establishments in England
Football clubs in Salisbury
Football clubs in England
Southern Football League clubs